The Samsung Galaxy Note 8.0 is an 8-inch Android-based tablet computer produced and marketed by Samsung Electronics. It belongs to the second generation of the Samsung Galaxy Note series tablets, which also includes a 10.1-inch model, the Galaxy Note 10.1. It was first sold in the US in April 2013. Like the larger model, it uses both touch and Samsung's S-Pen stylus. It is Samsung's first 8-inch tablet, and was followed later by a lower-end sibling, the Samsung Galaxy Tab 3 8.0.

History 
The Galaxy Note 8.0 was announced on 23 February 2013. It was shown along with the Galaxy S4 at the 2013 Mobile World Conference. Samsung confirmed that the Galaxy Note 8.0 would be released in the US on 11 April, with a price of $399.99 for the 16GB model.

Features
The Galaxy Note 8.0 is released with Android 4.1.2 Jelly Bean. An upgrade to Android 4.2.2 Jelly Bean is available in some areas as an over-the-air update and through Samsung Kies. In February 2014, Samsung included the Galaxy Note 8.0 on their upgrade list for Android 4.4.2 KitKat. Roll out of the Android 4.4.2 update began May 12, 2014. On June 4, 2014, Samsung announced the 4.4.2 update for U.S. tablets. The Android 4.4.2 update included updated TouchWiz applications, but, with the notable and inexplicable elimination of its crucial handwriting preferences, largely retained the tablet's original feature set. Bluetooth low energy capability was enabled with the Android 4.4.2 firmware update.

Samsung has customized the interface with its TouchWiz UX software. As well as apps from Google, including Google Play, Gmail and YouTube, it has access to Samsung apps such as ChatON, S Note, S Suggest, S Voice, S Translator, S Planner, Smart Remote (Peel), Smart Stay, Multi-Window, Air View, Group Play, and All Share Play.
The Camera User Interface is known from the Galaxy S3.

Like the Galaxy S4, the Galaxy Note 8.0 is equipped with an infrared transmitter for usage as an universal remote control.

The Galaxy Note 8.0 is available in WiFi-only, 3G & Wi-Fi, and 4G/LTE & WiFi variants. Storage ranges from 16 GB to 32 GB depending on the model, with a microSDXC card slot for expansion. It has an 8-inch WXGA TFT screen with a resolution of 1280x800 pixels. It also features a 1.3 MP front camera  and 5.0 MP AF rear-facing camera without flash. Its 5 megapixel rear camera also has the ability to record HD (720p) videos.

See also
 Samsung Galaxy Note series
 Samsung Electronics
 Samsung Galaxy Note 10.1
 Samsung Galaxy Note 10.1 2014 Edition
 Samsung Galaxy Tab 3 8.0

References

External links

 
 Note 8.0 Manual

Android (operating system) devices
Tablet computers introduced in 2013
Galaxy Note 8.0
Tablet computers